Sharpe's Enemy: Richard Sharpe and the Defence of Portugal, Christmas 1812 is the fifteenth historical novel in the Richard Sharpe series by Bernard Cornwell, first published in 1984. The story is set in 1812 during the Napoleonic Wars.

Plot summary
In the winter of 1812, a band of deserters from all the armies of the Peninsular War - French, British, Spanish and Portuguese - descends on the isolated hamlet of Adrados, on the Spanish-Portuguese border, led by Pot-au-Feu (Sergeant Deron, formerly Marshal Soult's chef). They slaughter the residents, sparing a number of women on pilgrimage to a convent in the village, including Lady Farthingdale and Madame Dubreton, the English-born wife of a French colonel of cavalry.

Major General Nairn sends Richard Sharpe, recently promoted to the rank of major to deliver the ransom demanded for Lady Farthingdale. Upon reaching Adrados, they encounter French Colonel Dubreton and his sergeant on a similar mission, to free Dubreton's wife. When they meet with "Maréchal" (Marshal) Pot-au-Feu, Sharpe is appalled to discover that Obadiah Hakeswill, his longtime bitter enemy (beginning from Sharpe's Tiger), is Pot-au-Feu's "colonel". They see both ladies are safe and deliver the ransom, but Hakeswill informs them that the money only safeguards the women's virtue, and that they must continue making payments. Colonel and Madame Dubreton are careful to conceal their connection from the kidnappers. Sharpe notes that Adrados is extremely defensible, with a castle, a watchtower and a convent. Madame Dubreton gives Sharpe a clue that she is being held in the convent.

Sharpe proposes to take the Light Company and two companies of the 60th American Rifles to make a sneak attack on the watchtower and the convent to free and protect the ladies until Colonel Kinney and his 113th Fusilier Regiment arrive to capture or kill the deserters. Sharpe chooses Christmas Eve for the attack, as the gang will almost certainly be drunk. Nairn foists Captain Gilliland and his unwanted troop of "Rocket Cavalry" onto Sharpe. The Prince Regent thinks rocket artillery is a marvelous idea and wants it field tested; Sharpe finds the rockets to be wildly inaccurate.

Sharpe captures the convent and frees the women. Pot-au-Feu is taken prisoner, but Hakeswill gets away. Recently arrived, aged Colonel Sir Augustus Farthingdale is reunited with his beloved young "wife". "Lady Farthingdale" is actually Josefina Lacosta, a high-class courtesan with whom Sharpe is intimately acquainted.

Shortly afterward, Dubreton arrives with his own forces. Dubreton repays Sharpe for saving his wife by handing over Hakeswill. He then invites Sharpe and the other British officers to dinner. There Sharpe first encounters Major Ducos, a French spy of great influence who will repeatedly trouble Sharpe in the future. The French demand that the British leave by nine o'clock the next morning. Farthingdale readily agrees, but Sharpe has misgivings. His Spanish partisan wife Teresa Moreno arrives and confirms his suspicions; she tells him that a sizable French force is advancing on the village, part of an overall plan to invade northern Portugal. He sends Teresa to take the news to Nairn.

Sharpe decides to make a stand and blackmails Lord Farthingdale into leaving (by threatening to reveal who Lady Farthingdale really is), thus leaving Sharpe in command. He sets a trap for the French, using Gilliland's Congreve rockets (at very close range) to stop the initial attack. British reinforcements arrive just in time to save Sharpe's greatly outnumbered men. Hakeswill escapes during the last hours of the fight and encounters and kills Teresa. He tries to desert to the French, but Dubreton returns him to Sharpe. After a court martial, Hakeswill is shot by a firing squad. He survives, but the grief-stricken Sharpe administers the coup de grace himself.

Characters
Richard Sharpe: Brevet major in the British Army 
Pot-au-Feu:  Sergeant Deron, who appears in Sharpe's Havoc, and is the leader of the renegade band

References to other novels
 Josefina LaCosta was the female lead in Sharpe's Eagle and Sharpe's love interest. She was last seen in Sharpe's Gold where she had set up house in Lisbon entertaining wealthy allied officers. Colonel Sir Augustus Farthingdale has her masquerade as his wife in exchange for his maintaining her in a life of luxury.
 Cornwell describes Adrados as the Gateway of God where outnumbered Spanish knights defeated Moors during the Wars of Spain. The convent in Adrados was set up to commemorate the piety of this event.
 Madame Dubreton uses a line from the poem "Eloise and Abelard" by Alexander Pope to hint at where the hostages are being kept. She said "withering in my bloom, lost in [a convent's] solitary gloom."

Television adaptation
The novel was adapted for the second season of the Sharpe television series. It guest starred Jeremy Child as Sir Augustus, Helena Mitchell as Sarah Dubreton and Tony Haygarth as Pot-au-Feu. The adaptation kept the basic plot of the novel but many details were changed, notably the character of Josefina was not reused and was replaced with a new character, Isabella (played by Elizabeth Hurley), the wife of Sir Augustus and an old flame of Sharpe, with whom he has a sexual encounter while rescuing her. (In the novels, Isabella is the name of Harper's wife; the television adaptation instead gives him a girlfriend named Ramona.) Teresa is introduced earlier near the beginning of the adaptation, as is Ducos who accompanies Dubreton to his first meeting with Hakeswill. Sharpe is not promoted to major until midway through the adaptation prior to his return to the convent, Teresa is killed earlier when Hakeswill escapes after the convent's capture and the final battle with the French is significantly downgraded, being reduced to a single repulsed charge. The task of finishing Hakeswill's execution is given to an anonymous officer, with Sharpe merely watching from the distance.

References

External links
 Section from Bernard Cornwell's website on Sharpe's Enemy
 Independent Review of Sharpe's Enemy

1984 British novels
Enemy
Fiction set in 1812
William Collins, Sons books